Procrica dinshona is a species of moth of the family Tortricidae. It is found in Ethiopia.

The wingspan is about 25 mm. The ground colour of the forewings is yellow, slightly tinged with orange and with brown and pale brownish strigulae (fine streaks) and dots. The hindwings are greyish cream.

Etymology
The species name refers to Dinsho Lodge in the Bale Mountains, the type locality.

References

Moths described in 2010
Archipini